Denis Mikhailovich Arkhipov (born May 19, 1979) is a Russian former professional ice hockey player. He played in the National Hockey League with the Nashville Predators and Chicago Blackhawks between 2000 and 2007, and then in the Kontinental Hockey League between 2008 and 2013. Internationally Arkhipov played for the Russian national team at the junior and senior level, including the 2003 and 2006 World Championships.

Playing career
Arkhipov was selected 60th overall in the third round of the 1998 NHL Entry Draft, the second choice of the Nashville Predators.

He made his National Hockey League (NHL) debut on January 8, 2001 in a 2–1 loss against the Vancouver Canucks in Vancouver. During this game he notched his first NHL point when he got an assist on a Richard Lintner goal against Bob Essensa. Two days later he scored his first NHL goal in a 5–2 win at the Edmonton Oilers. He scored when he took a Scott Hartnell pass and got it past Tommy Salo. He also got an assist on a Marián Cisár goal to make this his first ever NHL multi-point game.

In the 2001–02 NHL season he played in all 82 games with a career high 42 points. He led the Predators in goals, game-winning goals (6) and shooting percentage (16.9%). That year he centered the "Vowel Line" which also included, Vladimír Országh on right wing, and Martin Erat at left wing. They were called the Vowel Line because their last names all start with vowels.

Arkhipov played the 2004–05 NHL lockout season in the Russian Super League, and remained there for the 2005–06 season before signing as a free agent with the Chicago Blackhawks on July 6, 2006.

Records
Youngest player in Predator's franchise history to score 20 goals.

Career statistics

Regular season and playoffs

International

External links
 

1979 births
Living people
Chicago Blackhawks players
Ak Bars Kazan players
Atlant Moscow Oblast players
HC CSKA Moscow players
HC Neftekhimik Nizhnekamsk players
Milwaukee Admirals (IHL) players
Nashville Predators draft picks
Nashville Predators players
Russian ice hockey centres
Sportspeople from Kazan
Torpedo Nizhny Novgorod players